José Gomes de Abreu, better known as Zequinha de Abreu (September 19, 1880 – January 22, 1935) was a Brazilian musician and composer.

Abreu was born in Santa Rita do Passa Quatro, São Paulo state.  He is best known for the famous choro tune "Tico-Tico no Fubá" (1917), whose original title was "Tico-Tico no Farelo". Other well-known tunes he wrote were "Branca" and "Tardes em Lindóia."

Tico-Tico is played in various melodic versions all over the world.  Abreu died in São Paulo, aged 54.

External links 

 Website Zequinha de Abreu

References

1880 births
1935 deaths
People from Santa Rita do Passa Quatro
Brazilian composers